Cuprum Lubin SA – is a Polish professional men's volleyball club based in Lubin, founded in 2001. The club was promoted to the highest level of the Polish Volleyball League – PlusLiga in 2014.

Team
As of 2022–23 season

Coaching staff

Players

See also

References

External links
 Official website 
 Team profile at PlusLiga.pl 
 Team profile at Volleybox.net

Polish volleyball clubs
Volleyball clubs established in 2001
Sport in Lower Silesian Voivodeship
2001 establishments in Poland